Alex Brunner (born 8 December 1973) is an Italian former footballer who played as a goalkeeper. He currently works as a goalkeeping coach.

Football career

Early career
Brunner started his career at hometown club Triestina. After the club were relegated to Series C1 in the summer of 1991, Brunner gained his place in first team, making 5 appearances for the club in two Series C1 seasons. In the summer of 1993, he moved to Formia of Series C2, where he first became a regular.

Foggia & Bologna
Brunner joined U.S. Foggia of Serie A in 1994, starting his career as a backup keeper for several Serie A clubs. In his first season with the team, he just made 2 appearances, as second goalkeeper behind Francesco Mancini, but after the club suffered relegation, he became regular once again.
In summer 1996, Brunner joined newly promoted Serie A team Bologna. He spent 3 seasons at the Emilia-Romagna club, and made 6 appearances in Series A, as second goalkeeper behind Francesco Antonioli.

Como
He transferred to Como in June 1999, where he spent 4 seasons. In his first season with the club, Como just finished 10th in Serie C1, but in the second and third seasons, he helped the team to obtain consecutive promotions to Serie B and subsequently Serie A, which was also aided by the signing of new club president Enrico Preziosi. In the 2002–03 Serie A season, he competed with experienced Fabrizio Ferron for a starting spot, but still made 21 appearances for Como.

Return to Series B
After Como finished bottom of the table and suffered relegation to Serie B, Brunner transferred to Ternana of Serie B, replacing Sergio Marcon and Gianmatteo Mareggini, who had finished their contract with the club. Brunner played ahead of Tommaso Berni as the club's first choice keeper, and Ternana finished 7th that season.

Brunner left for Salernitana in July 2004, where competed for a starting spot with former first choice keeper Domenico Botticella. In January 2005, he left for Cagliari of Serie A, as the club's second choice keeper (replacing the recently departed Fanis Katergiannakis) behind Gennaro Iezzo and ahead of Luca Tomasig (who replaced the recently departed Davide Capello).

Return to Lega Pro
After the bankruptcy of Salernitana, Brunner returned to Serie C1 side Lucchese in 2005, on a free transfer,. He was the club's first choice keeper ahead of Mathieu Moreau, Michele Tambellini and Paolo Castelli. In June 2007, he joined Sorrento of Serie C1. In the next season, he left for Juve Stabia of Lega Pro Prima Divisione on a 2-year contract, where he was the first choice until he was released in March and replaced by Salvatore Soviero. In October 2009, he left for Itala San Marco of Lega Pro Seconda Divisione. Brunner along with Marcon, served as the backup of young keeper Omar Tusini.

Coaching career
After Itala San Marco were expelled from professional league, Brunner returned to Como in the 2009–10 season as an assistant goalkeeping coach, under Ottavio Strano, who was both the club's main goalkeeping coach, and the team's head coach, along with Oscar Brevi. On 18 June, his contract was renewed for another year. Brunner spent 7 years as goalkeeper coach at Udanise before in 2022 joining Watford FC

Honours
Como
 Serie B: 2001–02

References

External links

 
 Profile at Football.it 

Italian footballers
Serie A players
Serie B players
Serie C players
U.S. Triestina Calcio 1918 players
Calcio Foggia 1920 players
Bologna F.C. 1909 players
Como 1907 players
Ternana Calcio players
U.S. Salernitana 1919 players
Cagliari Calcio players
S.S.D. Lucchese 1905 players
S.S. Juve Stabia players
A.S.D. Itala San Marco Gradisca players
S.S. Formia Calcio players
Watford F.C. non-playing staff
Association football goalkeepers
Italian people of Austrian descent
Footballers from Trieste
1973 births
Living people